The Shops at Nanuet is a lifestyle center located in Nanuet, New York. It is located at the intersection of New York State Route 59 and Middletown Road and is also accessible via exit 14 of the New York State Thruway. Built on the site of the former Nanuet Mall, the Shops at Nanuet debuted in 2013. As of 2022, The mall currently maintains traditional tenants At Home, Stop & Shop, as well as a Regal Cinemas. The mall currently features a handful of classic brands such as White House/Black Market, Coach New York, LOFT, and Drybar.

History 
The original mall opened in 1969 with the two original anchor stores which were Bamberger's (later became Macy's) and Sears.  In 1994, a new wing was built anchored by Abraham & Straus, which became Stern's in 1995. When the Stern's brand was phased out in 2001, (with most other stores becoming Macy's stores) the anchor space became Boscov's in 2002, before the latter closed in May 2008 in preparation for the mall's demolition (Simon Property Group owned the Boscov's space while Macy's and Sears owned their respective real estate).

The mall went into decline following the opening of the nearby Palisades Center in March 1998. Nearly all of the stores except for Macy's and Sears vacated by early 2011, when Simon unveiled plans to rebuild the mall as The Shops at Nanuet, an outdoor mall featuring shops, restaurants, a fitness center, and a Regal Cinemas movie theater, which opened on November 7, 2013. By January 2012, demolition had begun. Construction started after the demolition and the new Shops at Nanuet opened on October 10, 2013.

Sears
On October 15, 2018, it was announced that Sears would be closing as part of a plan to close 142 stores nationwide. The store closed in January 2019. Representatives from the shopping center's owner, Simon Property Group, have discussed reconstructing the store, according to Clarkstown Town Supervisor George Hoehmann. Hoehmann said he held several discussions about the Sears space with Simon representatives since June and anticipated getting more details in the next few months. Although no formal plans have been filed, Simon officials want to bring up to three undisclosed national retailers into the space formerly occupied by the defunct department store.

Also, the adjacent property once occupied by the Sears Tire and Auto Center is being eyed for a hotel and additional retailers, Hoehmann said.

2018 and 2019
On November 29, 2018, it was announced that At Home furniture store would join the complex on the first floor, with additional mall space to be announced) coming on the second floor, to replace Macy's. At Home opened in February of 2021.

On September 23, 2019,  Fairway Market announced that they would be closing their Shops At Nanuet location. The store closed on September 25, 2019.

2020s
On November 18, 2020, Stop & Shop announced they would relocate from their current Nanuet location on South Middletown Road to the former Fairway Market Space. The location opened on August 6, 2021.

The former Sears store became a Depo House furniture store in 2022.  Buffalo Wild Wings replaced the former Zinburger location and opened on September 8, 2022. Also, a new Mexican restaurant known as Sombrero Tacoria replaced the former Qdoba in late 2022. A new coffee shop known as Roast'd replaced Starbucks.

The Regal Cinemas location was supposed to close in January 2023 due to the company’s financial struggles, but thanks to an online petition signed by local residents, the theater remains open.

Incidents 
Nanuet Mall was the site of the 1981 Brink's robbery, during which members of the Black Liberation Army and the May 19th Communist Movement murdered two police officers and a security guard during the robbery of an armored car.

References

External links
Shops at Nanuet Official Website

Dead Malls Article about Nanuet Mall
Nanuet Post Cards and Other Images (including Nanuet Mall) (Daniel Silverman)

Shopping malls established in 1969
Shopping malls in New York (state)
Simon Property Group
Buildings and structures in Rockland County, New York
Shopping malls in the New York metropolitan area
Tourist attractions in Rockland County, New York
1969 establishments in New York (state)